HPA may refer to:

Organizations
 Harry Potter Alliance, a charity
 Halifax Port Authority, Canada
 Hamburg Port Authority, Germany
 Hawaii Preparatory Academy, a school in Hawaii, US
 Health Protection Agency, UK
 Heerespersonalamt, the German Army Personnel Agency 1920-1944
 Hollywood Post Alliance, an American trade organization
 Houston Peace Academy of the Islamic Education Institute of Texas, US
 Hurlingham Polo Association, UK polo governing body
 HPA Toucan human-powered aircraft built by Hertfordshire Pedal Aeronauts

People
Hans Peter Anvin (born 1972), Swedish computer programmer
Howlin' Pelle Almqvist (Born 1978), Swedish lead singer of garage rock band The Hives

Science
 Hectopascal (hPa), a unit of pressure
 Human platelet antigen
 Human Protein Atlas
 Hydrogen pinch analysis
 Hypothalamic–pituitary–adrenal axis in physiology

Technology
High-performance addressing, in LCD displays
Host protected area of computer data storage
Human-powered aircraft
High-pressure air, in paintball guns
Horizontal Pod Autoscaling, the Kubernetes autoscaler.

Transport
 Honor Oak Park railway station (National Rail station code), in London, England
 Lifuka Island Airport, in Tonga

Other uses 
 Highland Prince Academy de Mexico, a group of schools in Tijuana